Rajpal & Sons is an Indian publishing house based in Delhi.

History

Rajpal & Sons was founded in 1912 by Rajpal Malhotra in Lahore. He was assassinated in 1929 for publishing a book called Rangeela Rasool. After his demise, his wife and son Vishwanath Malhotra took over the running of the publishing house. In 1947, after the partition of India and Pakistan, the publishing house shifted to New Delhi. The publishing house is now run by Meera Johri and her son Pranav Johri, the third and fourth generation descendants of Rajpal.

Business profile
Seven prime ministers and presidents of south Asia have been published by Rajpal & Sons, namely A. P. J. Abdul Kalam, Sarvepalli Radhakrishnan, Benazir Bhutto, Narendra Modi, I. K. Gujral, Atal Bihari Vajpayee and P. V. Narasimha Rao. In the field of classic Hindi literary writing, Harivansh Rai Bachchan, Ramdhari Singh Dinkar, Sachchidananda Vatsyayan, Mahadevi Varma, Amritlal Nagar, Acharya Chatursen Shastri, Vishnu Prabhakar and Kamleshwar have been published by Rajpal & Sons. Hindi translations of Nobel Prize–winning authors Rabindranath Tagore, Amartya Sen and Patrick Modiano are also on its list.

According to the publisher, 70 new titles are published every year, and the publishing house has a catalogue of 1500 books in print.

References

External links
 

Book publishing companies of India
Companies based in Delhi
Publishing companies established in 1912